The Serbian men's national under-17 basketball team is the boys' basketball team, administered by the Basketball Federation of Serbia, that represents Serbia in international under-17 (under age 17) men's basketball competitions, consisting mainly of the FIBA Under-17 Basketball World Cup.

Individual awards
World Cup All-Tournament Team
 Nikola Rakićević – 2014
Statistical leaders: Assists
 Ognjen Stanković – 2022

World Cup record

Updated on 16 July 2022

Coaches

Rosters

See also
 Serbian men's university basketball team
 Serbia men's national under-20 basketball team
 Serbia men's national under-19 basketball team
 Serbia men's national under-18 basketball team
 Serbia men's national under-16 basketball team

References

External links

M U17
Men's national under-17 basketball teams